Homophoberia is a genus of moths of the family Noctuidae. The genus was erected by Herbert Knowles Morrison in 1875.

Species
 Homophoberia apicosa (Haworth, 1809)
 Homophoberia cristata Morrison, 1875

References

External links
Original description: 

Acontiinae